Acrocercops chenopa is a moth of the family Gracillariidae. It is known from Uganda.

References

Endemic fauna of Uganda
chenopa
Moths of Africa
Moths described in 1932
Insects of Uganda